Events from the year 1669 in China.

Incumbents 
 Kangxi Emperor (8th year)
 Regents — Oboi

Viceroys
 Viceroy of Zhili, Shandong and Henan — Bai Bingzhen (– July 28)
 Viceroy of Zhejiang — Liu Zhaoqi
 Viceroy of Fujian — Zhang Chaolin 
 Viceroy of Chuan-Hu — Liu Zhaoqi
 Viceroy of Shan-Shaan — Moluo
 Viceroy of Liangguang — Zhou Youde, Jin Guangzu
 Viceroy of Yun-Gui — Gan Wenkun
 Viceroy of Liangjiang —  Maleji

Events 
 Kangxi deposes his regent Oboi with help of his grandmother Grand Dowager Empress Xiaozhuang, who had raised him, and has him executed. He takes full control of the empire from this point onward.
 a Chinese pharmaceutical company Tong Ren Tang (TRT) is  founded in Beijing, which is now the largest producer of traditional Chinese medicine (TCM).
 In 1669, Lanbu (1642–1679), the third holder of the Prince Jingjin title, was demoted by the Kangxi Emperor from a qinwang (first-rank prince) to a feng'en zhenguo gong
 Chahar ruler Abunai showed disaffection with Manchu Qing rule, and is placed under house arrested in 1669 in Shenyang and the Kangxi Emperor gave his title to his son Borni
 poet, essayist, and art historian Zhou Lianggong holds a party at his Pavilion for Viewing Paintings in Nanjing. Later he is again accused of corruption
 Sino-Russian border conflicts

Births 
 Jiang Tingxi (1669–1732), courtesy name Yangsun (杨孙), was a Chinese painter, and an editor of the encyclopedia Gujin Tushu Jicheng (Complete Collection of Ancient and Modern Writings and Charts).

Deaths 
 Yang Guangxian (1597–1669) a Chinese Muslim Confucian writer and astronomer who was the head of the Bureau of Astronomy (欽天監) from 1665 to 1669.

References

 
 .

 
China